The 1990 Japanese Touring Car Championship season was the 6th edition of the series. It began at Nishi Nippon on 18 March and finished after six events at Fuji Speedway on 11 November. The championship was won by Kazuyoshi Hoshino, driving for Team Impul.

Teams & Drivers

1Due to insufficient JTC-2 entries at Round 1, the class was combined with JTC-1.

Calendar
Overall winner in bold.

Championship Standings
Points were awarded 20, 15, 12, 10, 8, 6, 4, 3, 2, 1 to the overall top 10 as well as top 10 finishers in each class, with no bonus points for pole positions or fastest laps. All scores counted towards the championship. In cases where teammates tied on points, the driver who completed the greater distance during the season was given the higher classification.

References

Japanese Touring Car Championship
Japanese Touring Car Championship seasons